Narendra Poma (born 19 March 1959) is a Nepalese boxer. He competed in the men's featherweight event at the 1980 Summer Olympics. At the 1980 Summer Olympics, he lost to Sidnei dal Rovere of Brazil.

References

External links
 

1959 births
Living people
Nepalese male boxers
Olympic boxers of Nepal
Boxers at the 1980 Summer Olympics
Place of birth missing (living people)
Featherweight boxers